The 1962 Buffalo Bills season was the team’s third season in the American Football League.  The Bills finished the season with a 7–6–1 record, third place in the AFL East; it was the Bills' first-ever season finishing with a winning record.

The Bills lost their first five games of the season, but finished the final nine games with only one loss (and one tie).

Season summary

The Bills were a run-heavy offense in 1962; they led the league in rushing yards, with 2,480. The Bills ran the ball 58.8 percent of the time on offense. The Bills gained 5.0 yards per carry as a team, tied for the league lead.

Bills running back Cookie Gilchrist, who came to the Bills in 1962 from the Canadian Football League, led the AFL in rushing yards with 1,096 yards. and 13 rushing touchdowns. Running back Wray Carlton ran for 530 yards, but led the league with 5.6 yards per rushing attempt.

The Bills' defense got a major infusion of talent on defense, as rookies Tom Sestak, Mike Stratton, Ray Abruzzese, and Booker Edgerson won starting jobs.

Offseason
During the offseason, the Bills removed former coach Buster Ramsey and hired Lou Saban to helm the team.

The Bills also picked up former Chargers quarterback Jack Kemp off the waiver wire. Kemp had a broken hand, and as such could not play until the twelfth game of the season, but he would prove to be the best Bills quarterback of the 1960s.

AFL draft

Defensive lineman Tom Sestak and linebacker Mike Stratton started for the Bills on defense as rookies; both would go on to be AFL All-Stars multiple times.

Ernie Davis

The Bills selected Heisman Trophy winner Ernie Davis from Syracuse with their first draft pick, and Davis may have very well signed with his hometown Bills (Davis grew up in nearby Elmira), since the National Football League team that drafted him, the Washington Redskins, was led by avowed racist George Preston Marshall and had only drafted Davis as a token black to avoid losing the Redskins' stadium lease; Davis refused to play for the Redskins. The Redskins traded Davis's rights to the Cleveland Browns, and Davis instead signed with the Browns. Unfortunately for all parties, Davis was diagnosed with acute monocytic leukemia in the summer of 1962, and the Browns barred him from playing for the team (despite the cancer being in remission by the time the preseason began). The cancer later returned, and Davis died May 18, 1963, having never played a down of professional football.

Personnel

Staff

Final roster

Preseason

Regular season

Standings

Roster

Awards and Records

References

Buffalo Bills on Pro Football Reference
Buffalo Bills on jt-sw.com

Buffalo Bills
Buffalo Bills seasons
Buffalo Bills